KCRC may refer to:

 KCRC (AM), a radio station licensed to Enid, Oklahoma, United States
 Kowloon-Canton Railway Corporation